Doran Consulting is an independent engineering consultancy based in Belfast, Northern Ireland. It has expanded to become one of the major civil and structural engineering consultancies in Ireland.

Doran Consulting provide civil, structural, CDMC, water, waste water and traffic engineering expertise and other specialised advice and consulting, such as project management and expert witness.

The company operates both nationally and internationally, having completed projects in countries such as Northern Ireland and Dubai. Key clients include Northern Ireland Water and George Best Belfast City Airport.

The company was founded in 1953, became a partnership in 1972 and from 1 June 2005 was incorporated to form Doran Consulting Limited. The technical directors believe that the status of the company as an independent consultancy is important as it assures clients that the company will provide impartial advice of the highest standard.

Directors
 Ian Long, Managing Director
 Lynda Martin, Director
 Campbell Davis, Director
 Michael Nelson, Director
 Paul Keown, Director
 Ciara Lappin, Technical Director
 Marco Forte, Finance Director

References

Sources
Belfast Telegraph, 26 June 2006

External links
Doran Consulting

Companies of Northern Ireland
Engineering consulting firms